Higehiro, short for , is a Japanese romantic comedy light novel series written by Shimesaba and illustrated by booota. It was serialized online between March 2017 and August 2018 on Kadokawa's user-generated novel publishing website Kakuyomu. It was later published by Kadokawa Shoten with five volumes between February 2018 and June 2021 under their Kadokawa Sneaker Bunko imprint. A manga adaptation with art by Imaru Adachi has been serialized in Kadokawa Shoten's shōnen manga magazine Monthly Shōnen Ace since November 2018. The light novel is licensed in North America by Kadokawa and Yen Press. The manga is licensed by One Peace Books. An anime television series adaptation by Project No.9 aired from April to June 2021.

Plot
Young handsome salaryman Yoshida had finally gathered up the courage to confess his feelings for his employer and longtime crush Airi Gotou. Sadly though, he ended up rejected and goes out drinking with his co-worker/best friend Hashimoto to relieve himself of his sorrows. While heading back home in a drunken state, he meets Sayu Ogiwara, a teenage high school girl who asks to spend the night with him. He lets her in out of pity and because he is too exhausted to argue, saying to himself that he will chase her out tomorrow. The next day now sobered up, Yoshida asks Sayu how she ended up at his apartment: she reveals that she had run away from her family and home in Hokkaido and has been prostituting herself to random men in exchange for a place to stay. Now knowing her backstory, Yoshida feeling bad for her finds himself unable to kick her out of his house and their time of living together begins.

Characters

 A 26-year-old salaryman with short black hair, brown eyes, a pretty decent face and a well-built frame. Living alone most of his life, Yoshida grew to be a highly independent person. He is an exceptional and reliable employee who is always dedicated to his work; he puts in overtime daily and even helps lighten the load of tasks of his colleagues. He was rejected by a coworker and while on the way home, drunk, he saw a teenage girl under a lamppost. 

 A runaway high school student from Asahikawa, Hokkaido who survived by seducing men and sleeping in unfamiliar locations before she met Yoshida under a lamppost. She got to sleep—and then live—in Yoshida's apartment, albeit, in his words, for the time being. She gets a part-time job at a convenience store in Tokyo. She is actually from a wealthy family but left home due to family issues.

 Yoshida's boss at the IT company he is working for and his primary love interest. She is a beautiful and mature fair-skinned woman with silky brown hair that is either tied or braided on the right side, rich brown eyes, a beauty mark under her left eye, and a huge chest. At the start of the story, she rejected Yoshida and claimed that she liked someone else, but this was a lie and she had feelings for him.

 Yoshida's junior and mentee at the IT company secretly has romantic feelings for him. She generally has a laid-back personality and remains relaxed and unfazed even if deadlines and tasks are piling up. Although she is highly capable of doing her job efficiently, she opts not to exert effort as she believes overworking will soon just result in death. Instead, she uses the favouritism she gets from her other superiors to her advantage.

 Yoshida's co-worker and friend. He is a young man with black hair and brown eyes. He wears a pair of eyeglasses. He gets along with everyone in their company and is not as serious about work as Yoshida but still gets his job done. He jokes around a lot to lighten the mood and often teases Yoshida.

 A high school girl and Sayu's best friend, who works part-time at the same convenience store. She is a gyaru. She comes from a wealthy family, but she is not on good terms with them.

 Yoshida's upperclassman and first girlfriend. She later joins his company.

 Kyouya was one of Sayu's many hookups who offered for her to stay with him at his place in exchange for sexual favours. He later gets a job at the same convenience store as Sayu and Asami.

 Sayu's older brother, who is the president and CEO of their family's food company.

 Sayu and Issa's mother who works for the Ogiwara Foods Corporation along with her adult son. She seems to care more about Issa's achievements and needs more than her daughter; when Sayu still lived at home (even when she was a child) she rarely showed Sayu any type of parental love or affection, often being harsh and cold towards her (she might have also been abusive, both mentally and physically); she even went as far as to not allowing her daughter to hang out with her friends. Years ago while she was pregnant with Sayu, her husband, who had a knack for constantly cheating on her with other women, had already moved on to someone else and tried to force her to get an abortion but she refused, thus leading to Sayu's birth. To her, Sayu simply became proof as well as a painful reminder that her husband was no longer in her family's life.

 One of Sayu's close friends from Hokkaido and classmates from Asahikawa Dairoku High School. Due to her beautiful looks, she was often the victim of bullying by other girls who were jealous of her, which later led her to kill herself by jumping off the roof of her school, leaving Sayu distraught. The aftermath of her death caused further strain between Sayu and her mother, who believed that Sayu was the one who drove her friend to suicide. Being constantly blamed for her friend's death led Sayu to leave home and became emotionally unstable.

Media

Light novels
The series was written by Shimesaba and illustrated by booota and was serialized online between March 2017 and August 2018 on Kadokawa's user-generated novel publishing website Kakuyomu. It was later published by Kadokawa Shoten with five volumes between February 2018 and June 2021 under their Kadokawa Sneaker Bunko imprint. It ended in its fifth volume, which was released on June 1, 2021. Kadokawa is publishing the novels digitally in English. Yen Press will also publish their own release of the series.

Manga
A manga adaptation with art by Imaru Adachi has been serialized in Kadokawa Shoten's shōnen manga magazine Monthly Shōnen Ace since November 2018. It has been collected in nine tankōbon volumes. In March 2021, One Peace Books announced their license to the manga in English and would begin releasing the series in October 2021.

Anime
On December 26, 2019, an anime adaptation was announced by Kadokawa Sneaker Bunko. The adaptation was revealed to be a television series produced by Dream Shift, animated by Project No.9 and directed by a director under the pseudonym of Manabu Kamikita, with Deko Akao handling series composition, and Takayuki Noguchi designing the characters. Tomoki Kikuya is composing the series' music. The series aired from April 5 to June 28, 2021, on AT-X, Tokyo MX, and BS11. Dialogue+ performed the series' opening theme song "Omoide Shiritori", while Kaori Ishihara performed the series' ending theme song "Plastic Smile". It ran for 13 episodes.  Crunchyroll licensed the series outside of Southeast Asia. Muse Communication has licensed the series in Southeast Asia and South Asia.

Reception
The light novel series has a total of more than 400,000 copies in circulation, including digital copies. The series appeared at 4th in the bunkobon edition of Takarajimasha's annual light novel guide book Kono Light Novel ga Sugoi! in 2019.

Notes

References

Works cited
 "Ch." is shortened form for chapter and refers to a chapter number of the Higehiro manga.
 "Ep." is shortened form for episode and refers to an episode number of the Higehiro anime.
 "LN" refers to a volume of the Higehiro light novel.

Other references

External links
  at Kakuyomu 
  
  
 

2018 Japanese novels
2021 anime television series debuts
Anime and manga based on light novels
AT-X (TV network) original programming
Crunchyroll anime
Kadokawa Dwango franchises
Kadokawa Shoten manga
Kadokawa Sneaker Bunko
Light novels
Light novels first published online
Muse Communication
Project No.9
Romantic comedy anime and manga
Shōnen manga
Yen Press titles